Mehraneh roud is a river in Tabriz, crossing through the middle of Tabriz.The Mehraneh roud starts in the Sahand mountains.

Sources
مهرانه رود

See also 
Aji Chay

Landforms of East Azerbaijan Province
Rivers of Tabriz